Halesson Tiago Barbosa Honorato, also known as Philco, is a Brazilian footballer from Iguaçu, Brazil born on February 4, 1989, that currently plays for HNK Zmaj Makarska.

Career
Honorato started at Brazilian giant Clube Atlético Paranaense.  He played in the Curitiba club's youth academy, where he prospered; he made his professional debut in 2007.  Clube Atlético Paranaense president João Augusto Fleury da Rocha has said that Philco had been looked at by several Italian teams.  He has also stated that the young Brazilian was widely regarded as the new Zico; even national team coach Dunga has stated similar information to journalists. In June 2007, Philco moved to S.C. Braga, but he only made three substitute appearances in the Portuguese Liga for the club.

On 25 January 2018, Philco joined Xewkija Tigers in Malta. He left the club at the end of the season, where his contract expired. But in January 2019, he joined the club again. He left the club in the summer and joined Żebbuġ Rovers on 5 September 2019.

See also
Football in Brazil

References

External links
 CBF
 Philco at ZeroZero
 

Brazilian footballers
1989 births
Living people
Club Athletico Paranaense players
S.C. Braga players
Portimonense S.C. players
América Futebol Clube (PE) players
Santa Cruz Futebol Clube players
Central Sport Club players
Association football forwards